Jovanka Stanojević (born 11 June 1979) is a Serbian painter.

Biography and career 

Born in Belgrade in 1979, Stanojević obtained a Bachelor of Arts in fine arts in 2005 and a Master of Fine Arts in drawing in 2009. She is currently completing her Ph.D. dissertation at the Faculty of Fine Arts in Belgrade. Since 2008, Stanojević worked as an assistant professor at the Faculty of Art and Design, John Nasibitt University of Belgrade. Since 2015 works as an assistant professor at the Academy of Fine Arts Trebinje, University of East Sarajevo, Bosnia and Herzegovina.

She had exhibitions in Serbia, United Kingdom (Derwent Art Prize), Switzerland, Spain (Guasch Coranty International Painting Prize 2012), Greece (ArTower Agora 2006, Art Athina 2010), Germany (Nordart 2013, 2014 and 2015), Austria, Hungary, Italy, and received a number of painting awards (including: Second Prize of Derwent Art Prize 2018, two Public Choice Awards at the Kunstwerk Carlshütte NordArt 2014 and 2013 in Büdelsdorf,  First Prize for Drawing, Vladimir Velickovic Foundation, Grand Prix Milena 2007 at the 11th biennial In the light of Milena, Milena Pavlović-Barili Foundation, 2nd prize at the Exhibition of the Young 2011, Niš Art Foundation and Philip Morris Industry Art Foundation).

Stanojević won residencies at the International School of Painting, Drawing and Sculpture in Montecastello, Italy (2004) and at the Outside Project in Florence (2007).

Art
Stanojević's art can be considered a realism not reduced to recognition, in the convention that a painting is always an interpretation of the world determined by conventions, ideology and the spirit of the time. Realism becomes one of the possible ways of exploration of a new society and new perspectives on society and nature. Through her portraits, the Serbian artist allows us to perceive a subject as a significant image of our cultural environment, that offers something more than a nicely composed and a convincing interpretation of a person.

An artistic interest inclined toward less glorified aspects of everyday life led Stanojević to depict subjects possessing greatness not related to social status or physical beauty, such as in hairstyles and enlarged female heads, submitted to the celebration of a woman in all her uniqueness.  This is not a romantic escape into an idyllic world of beauty and grace, but a sign of fundamental isolation, exploration of the metaphysics of the outer and inner environment, microcosm of the body, vulnerability.

Face to face with Stanojević's large scale portraits, viewer is unable to see the painting in full, his eye is forced to scan it and his brain starts isolating elements and making connections between them. Looking at the painting, viewer can come closer to it or step farther away from it, turning himself into a zooming lens.

Stanojević's work, telling us about artist's own relationship with reality, tries to let the viewer see for a moment the world from another perspective, giving him the freedom to change perspectives. The viewer is pulled into a moment and forced to think about what he sees.

Exhibitions

Solo exhibitions (selection)
2017 – Faces, Drina Gallery, Belgrade
2016 – Municipal Gallery (Δημοτική Πινακοθήκη της Κέρκυρας), Corfu, Greece
2014 – Palazzo Pretorio, Sansepolcro, Italy
2014 – Cultural Center Novi Sad, Serbia
2009 – Gallery 73, Belgrade, Serbia
2007 – Gallery of the Ilija M. Kolarac Foundation, Belgrade
2007 – Center for Study in Cultural Development, Belgrade
2006 – ArTower Agora, Athens, Greece
2005 – DKSG, Belgrade
2004 – Center for Study in Cultural Development, Belgrade
2003 – Center for Study in Cultural Development, Belgrade
2002 – Faculty of Fine Arts Gallery, Belgrade

Group exhibitions (selection)
2018 – Derwent Art Prize, Mall Galleries, London; Trowbridge Arts, Wiltshire, UK
2018 – Likovna Jesen, Cultural Centre Laza Kostić, Sombor
2017 – Laureates of Vladimir Veličković Prize for Drawing Achievements, Haos Gallery, Belgrade
2017 – Delirium, Stalla Madulain, Zurich, Switzerland
2016 – 56th October Salon – The Pleasure of Love, Belgrade City Museum
2016 – Cukaricki Likovni Salon, Gallery 73, Belgrade
2016 – Like There is No Tomorrow,  Drina Gallery
2015 – NordArt 2015, Kunstwerk Carlshütte, Büdelsdorf, Germany
2014 – NordArt 2014, Kustwerk Carlshütte, Büdelsdorf, Germany
2014 – BelgradeNow, Vorlarlberg Museum, Map Kellergalerie and Kunstforum Montefon, Schruns, Austria
2013 – Serbian Artists, Graphisoft Park, Budapest, Hungary
2013 – NordArt 2013, Kunstwerk Carlshütte, Büdelsdorf, Germany
2013 – The Exhibition of the Young 2013, Niš Art Foundation – Philip Morris International, Philip Morris Industry, Niš, Serbia
2013 – Project Old Age, Association Laundry (Belgrade), Art Encounters (Museum of Modern Art Subotica), Gallery Nadežda Petrović (Čačak) and Cultural Centre of Belgrade
2012 – Guasch Coranty International Painting Prize 2012 – Finalists, Centre d’Art Tecla Sala, Barcelona, Spain
2012 – International Exhibition of Contemporary Drawing, Swiss Art Space, Lausanne, Switzerland
2012 – December Exhibition, ULUS, Belgrade
2011 – The Exhibition of the Young 2011, Niš Art Foundation – Philip Morris International, Philip Morris Industry, Niš
2011 – XV Spring Annual, Art Gallery of Cultural Center of Čačak, Serbia
2010 – Art Athina 2010, Athens
2010 – Work in Progress – Art Collection Šumatovčka , Belgrade
2010 – The Exhibition of the Young 2010, Niš Art Foundation – Philip Morris International, Philip Morris Industry, Niš
2010 – Private Collection – Ljubomir Eric, Art Pavilion Cvijeta Zuzorić, Belgrade
2009 – Zlatibor 2008, Art Gallery RTS, Belgrade
2009 – December Exhibition, ULUS, Belgrade
2008 – Exhibition of Purchased Works of Art in the Field of Fine and Applied Arts, Gallery Magacin, Belgrade
2008 – Autumn Exhibition, ULUS, Art Pavilion Cvijeta Zuzorić, Belgrade
2008 – XIII Easter Eggs Auction, Gallery Pero, Belgrade
2007 – Čukarički Likovni Salon, Gallery 73, Belgrade
2007 – 11. International Biennial "In the Light of Milena", Gallery of Milena Pavlović–Barili, Požarevac, Serbia
2007 – Annual Exhibition, Gallery of the Ilija M. Kolarac Foundation, Belgrade
2007 – XXI Century Presents, Blok Gallery, Belgrade
2007 – View, Drawing, Attitude V, Cultural Center of Novi Sad, Novi Sad, Serbia
2007 – 8. Biennial of Drawings and Small Scale Sculpture, Art Pavilion Cvijeta Zuzorić
2007 – De Natura East – West, ArTower Agora, Athens
2007 – View, Drawing, Attitude IV, Gallery 73, Belgrade
2007 – Spring Exhibition, ULUS, Art Pavilion Cvijeta Zuzorić, Belgrade
2006 – New Members of Association of Fine Artists of Serbia (ULUS), Art Pavilion Cvijeta Zuzorić, Belgrade
2005 – Studies of Diligence, Gallery Zlatno Oko, Novi Sad
2004 – Studies of Diligence, Cultural Centre of Belgrade 
2004 – The Awarded Students' Exhibition 2003/2004, Faculty of Fine Arts Gallery, Belgrade
2004 – Readers in Čačak, in cooperation with publishing house CLIO, Čačak

Awards
 2018 – SECOND PRIZE, Derwent Art Prize 2018
2018 – MILAN KONJOVIĆ AWARD, Likovna Jesen, Sombor
2016 – "FIRST PRIZE", Vladimir Velickovic Foundation, Belgrade
 2014 – "PUBLIC CHOICE AWARD",  NordArt 2014 - Kunstwerk Carlshütte, Germany
 2013 – "PUBLIC CHOICE AWARD",  NordArt 2013 - Kunstwerk Carlshütte, Germany
 2011 – "SECOND PRIZE", Nis Art Foundation - Philip Morris International, Nis
 2011 – The City Library „Vladislav Petkovic – Dis“  Award,  XV Spring Annual, Cacak
 2007 – GRAND PRIX "MILENA", 11. International Biennial "IN THE LIGHT OF MILENA"
 2007 – "THE BEST SOLO EXHIBITION IN THE SEASON OF 2006/2007", Ilija M. Kolarac Foundation, Belgrade
 2006 – "THE BEST NEW MEMBER OF ASSOCIATION OF FINE ARTISTS OF SERBIA (ULUS)"
 2004 – "RISTA I BETA VUKANOVIC - for painting achievements"

Residencies and Art Symposiums 
2015 – Nord Art Sympozium, Kunstwerk Carlshütte, Germany 
2014 – Nord Art Sympozium, Kunstwerk Carlshütte, Germany
2013 – LindArt, Lendava, Slovenia
2007 – Outside Project, Florence
2007 – Colony of RTS, Zlatibor, Serbia
2004 – International School of Painting, Drawing and Sculpture, Montecastello, Italy

References

External links

Jovanka Stanojevic Art - Official Website
Schleswig-Holstein 18:00 - Philipp Jess interviews Jovanka Stanojević at the NordArt, Norddeutscher Rundfunk, June 11, 2014.

1979 births
Living people
Artists from Belgrade
Serbian painters
Serbian women artists
Serbian women painters
Serbian women